The Reedham Ferry Drainage Mill, also known as The Red Mill is a former drainage windmill found on the River Yare on The Broads in Norfolk. It is now a privately owned holiday home.

History
Built in the 1840s, in 1957 it was converted by Geoffery Livingston, a businessman from Leicester into a holiday home.

In media
The Reedham Ferry Drainage Mill is seen in episode 2 of the UK TV series, Interceptor.

Gallery

References

Windmills in Norfolk
Windmills of the Norfolk Broads
Tower mills in the United Kingdom
Broadland